The Waingaro River is a river of the Waikato region of New Zealand's North Island. It flows generally southwest from its origins near Glen Afton and Glen Massey, west of Ngāruawāhia, to reach a northern arm of Raglan Harbour (see 1:50,000 map). Its main tributary is Kahuhuru Stream, which Highway 22 follows for several kilometres. At Waingaro it is fed by a hot spring.

Geology 

The lower river flows over Puaroan age (about 150 million years ago), blue-grey Puti siltstone.

Pollution 
The Waingaro River is one of the largest sources of sediment in Whaingaroa Harbour, partly because it is 99 percent unfenced.

Pollution has been worsening for phosphorus, though nitrogen has improved, as shown in this table of important (i.e. slope direction probability over 95% and RSKSE over ±1% pa) improvements, or deteriorations (-) in relative seasonal Kendall slope estimator (RSKSE) trends (monthly records are flow-adjusted using a Lowess curve fit with 30% span.) - Turbidity is also poor.

See also
List of rivers of New Zealand

References

 
 New Zealand 1:50000 Topographic Map Series sheet BD32 – Raglan

External links 

 most of the river is close to Ohautira and Waingaro Roads, so many images are available in street scene on https://maps.google.com/
 water quality at Ruakiwi Rd LAWA WRC
 water level at Waingaro
 1955 Waingaro Landing aerial photo - the foreground shows part of the Kerikeri River arm of the harbour, which is over 3 km long. The Waingaro River joins the estuary in the middle left of the photo.
 Photo of oil launch 'Nita'.
 2012 Estuarine Vegetation Survey - page 15 describes the wildlife in the Waingaro and Kerikeri River arm of the harbour.

Rivers of Waikato
Waikato District
Rivers of New Zealand